Propylene glycol dinitrate (PGDN, ttup 1,2-propylene glycol dinitrate, or 1,2-propanediol dinitrate) is an organic chemical, an ester of nitric acid and propylene glycol. It is structurally similar to nitroglycerin, except that it has one fewer nitrate group. It is a characteristically and unpleasantly smelling colorless liquid, which decomposes at 121 °C, below its boiling point. It is flammable and explosive. It is shock-sensitive and burns with a clean flame producing water vapor, carbon monoxide, and nitrogen gas. 

C3H6(ONO2)2 → 3 CO + 3 H2O + N2

The principal current use of propylene glycol dinitrate is as a propellant in Otto Fuel II, together with 2-nitrodiphenylamine and dibutyl sebacate. Otto Fuel II is used in some torpedoes as a propellant.

Nitrates of polyhydric alcohols, of which propylene glycol dinitrate is an example, have been used in medicine for the treatment of angina pectoris, and as explosives since the mid-nineteenth century.

PGDN affects blood pressure, causes respiratory toxicity, damages liver and kidneys, distorts vision, causes methoglobinuria, and can cause headache and lack of coordination. It may be absorbed through skin. Its primary toxicity mechanism is methemoglobinemia. It may cause permanent nerve damage. 

For occupational exposures, the National Institute for Occupational Safety and Health has set a recommended exposure limit at 0.05 ppm (0.3 mg/m3) over an eight-hour workday, for dermal exposures.

References

Nitrate esters
Antianginals
Explosive chemicals
Liquid explosives
Monopropellants